Kimch'aek, formerly Sŏngjin (Chosŏn'gŭl: 성진, Hancha: 城津), is a city in North Hamgyong Province, North Korea. It was an open port in 1899. It has a population of 207,699.

Etymology
The city received its current name in 1951 during the Korean War, in honor of the Korean People's Army (KPA) general, Kim Chaek. It was known as Jōshin during Japanese rule between 1910 and 1945.

Climate
Kimchaek has a hot-summer humid continental climate (Köppen climate classification: Dfb).

Administrative divisions
Kimch'aek-si is divided into 22 tong (neighbourhoods) and 22 ri (villages):

Economy
Kimchaek is an important port on the Sea of Japan (East Sea of Korea), and is home to an ironworks and the Kimch’aek Polytechnic Institute.

Transport
Kimchaek is on the Pyongra Line railway.

The city has one trolleybus line, with a length of 9.1 km, running from Songnam-dong to Haksong-dong with the depot located in Sinpyong-dong.

See also

 List of cities in North Korea
Geography of North Korea

Notes

References

Further reading

Dormels, Rainer. North Korea's Cities: Industrial facilities, internal structures and typification. Jimoondang, 2014.

External links
City profile of Kimchaek 

Cities in North Hamgyong
Port cities and towns in North Korea